The Certificate is a novel by Isaac Bashevis Singer, published in English in 1992 (published in Yiddish in 1967). David, a poor, young Yiddish writer wishes to emigrate to Palestine from Poland, and because married couples are given preference, he tries to arrange for a marriage certificate to be purchased for him by a wealthy woman whose fiancee lives in Palestine. The narrative deals with the abject poverty of David, as well as his Jewish heritage, and details the rise of both Communism and Zionism.

1967 American novels
Novels by Isaac Bashevis Singer